G 2/19 is a decision issued by the Enlarged Board of Appeal of the European Patent Office (EPO) on 16 July 2019, which deals with three legal questions, the third relating to whether oral proceedings before the EPO Boards of Appeal may be held in Haar in the Munich district rather than in Munich per se, when a party objects to the oral proceedings being held in Haar.

Background
In October 2017, the Boards of Appeal of the EPO were relocated from the EPO main building in Munich, i.e. from the so-called "Isar building", to Haar. While, under the European Patent Convention (EPC), the European Patent Office is located in Munich with a branch in The Hague, Haar is a municipality located in the Munich district outside Munich per se. The third question referred in decision T 831/17 by Board 3.5.03 thus boiled down to questioning whether the relocation of the Boards of Appeal to Haar was in conformity with the EPC.

Decision
At the end of the oral proceedings held on July 16, 2019, the Enlarged Board of Appeal announced its decision that oral proceedings before the Boards of Appeal may be held at their location in Haar without infringing Articles 113(1) (right to be heard) and 116(1) EPC (oral proceedings).

The first two referred questions were also dealt with. The first was found to be inadmissible, while the second was answered as follows (unofficial English translation):

Such an appeal has no suspensive effect."

The Enlarged Board's written decision was issued in September 2019.

See also
 R 19/12, decision of the Enlarged Board of Appeal, following which a reform of the EPO was undertaken aiming at increasing the perception of independence of the Boards of Appeal from the executive branch of the EPO

Notes

References

External links
 Decision G 2/19 of the Enlarged Board of Appeal of 16 July 2019
 English translation (OJ EPO 2020, A87)
 Decision T 0831/17 (Haar oder München als Ort der mündlichen Verhandlung) of 25.2.2019 (referring decision)

G 2019 2